is a Japanese footballer currently playing as a goalkeeper for Vegalta Sendai.

Career statistics

Club
.

Notes

International 

 Japan national under-18 football team
 2020 AFC U-19 Championship qualification（Group J 1st）
 Japan national under-19 football team
 Japan national under-20 football team
 Japan national under-22 football team
 2022 AFC U-23 Asian Cup qualification（Group K 1st）

References

External links

 

2001 births
Living people
Japanese footballers
Japan youth international footballers
Association football goalkeepers
J1 League players
J2 League players
Vegalta Sendai players